Underground Out of Poland is the debut studio album by Polish punk rock band Dezerter. It was released in US during 1987 through Maximumrocknroll Records (Joey Shithead from D.O.A. helped in the release), and was re-released in 1996 by QQRYQ Productions and 2002 by Pop Noise Records. Track 1-4 was recorded in 1983, in Studio Wawrzyszew, 5-8 and 15-17 in 1984 at Jarocin Festival, 10-15 and 18 on illegal session on Program 1 Polskiego Radia studio.

The cover art was created by David Lester and Martin Sprouse.

Underground Out of Poland is considered to be one of the most important albums in the history of Polish rock.

Track listing

Personnel
 Dariusz "Skandal" Hajn - vocal
 Robert "Robal" Matera - vocal, guitar
 Krzysztof Grabowski - percussion, lyrics
 Dariusz "Stepa" Stepnowski - vocal, bass

Release history

References

1987 debut albums
Dezerter albums